Elhadj Dembo Sylla is a Guinean politician  in the National Assembly (Guinea). He is President of the  minority Parliamentary Group Alliance Patriotique .

References

Members of the National Assembly (Guinea)
Gamal Abdel Nasser University of Conakry alumni
Living people
1956 births